Fonna Hospital Trust is a health trust which administrates hospitals and institutions in Haugaland, Sunnhordland and parts of Hardanger.  Fonna Health Trust is one of five local health trusts owned by Western Norway Regional Health Authority. The trust has over 3333 employees as of 2019.

Hospitals and institutions
 Haugesund Hospital
 Stord Hospital
 Odda Hospital
 Valen Hospital
 Haugaland DPS
 Karmøy DPS
 Folgefonn DPS
 Avdeling Sauda
 Stord DPS

References

External links
 Official website

Health trusts of Norway